David Nicholas Reyne (born 14 May 1959) is an Australian actor, musician, television and radio presenter. Reyne was born in Lagos, Nigeria to an Australian mother and English diplomat father. The family moved to Victoria, Australia in the early 1960s. Reyne lives in Mount Eliza, Victoria. He was educated at The Peninsula School, Mount Eliza.

Career

Music 
In 1978 when Clutch Cargo became the band Australian Crawl, Reyne, younger brother of lead singer James, continued as drummer. He filled this role for ten months before leaving to continue his acting education. He was later Vocalst for Cats Under Pressure (1984) and Chantoozies (1986–90). Reyne co-wrote "Polar Notch" and "Let Me Be" (with Simon Hussey) for Cats Under Pressure, the latter was covered by Daryl Braithwaite. Whilst with Chantoozies, Reyne also sang backing vocals. Chantoozies most popular tracks were covers of Redbone's "Witch Queen", John Kongos' "He's Gonna Step on You Again" and Stephen Stills' "Love the One You're With"; fellow members included Ally Fowler, Tottie Goldsmith and Eve von Bibra.

Acting
Reyne began his acting career with a minor role in the 1983 film, Skin Deep. At the April 1985 TV Week Logie Awards ceremony, he won the 1984 Best New Talent Logie for his work in the ongoing role of Martin Kabel in the ABC series Sweet and Sour. Reyne's role as Kabel, "The Takeaways" guitarist/vocalist was shared with John Clifforth of the Australian pop music band Deckchairs Overboard who performed the on-screen vocals. Reyne followed this in 1985 with the ongoing role of Detective Vince Bailey in Nine Network soap opera Possession. Reyne also played lothario Dr. Guy Reid in the final two seasons of the Australian drama series, The Flying Doctors. In 2012, Reyne guest appeared in Neighbours, playing Dale Madden. However, he only appeared in one episode.

Television 
Reyne has also worked as a television presenter. He briefly hosted Midday in 1995 with Tracy Grimshaw and has also worked as a reporter for the travel show Getaway between 1992 and 2006, and again since 2010.

After leaving Getaway at the end of 2005, Reyne signed with Network Ten to co-host with Kim Watkins the new morning show 9am with David and Kim which began 30 January 2006 and ended at the end of 2009.

Radio 
In May 2012, Reyne joined smoothFM in Sydney and Melbourne to host Wind Down from 8pm - 12am on weeknights. He remained with the station until his contract ended in March 2013.

Personal life 
Reyne married Karina Loscher in 1994; they have two children who are both musicians.

References

External links
 
 TV.com entry on David Reyne
 David Reyne Channel Ten biography

1959 births
Australian Crawl members
Australian drummers
Australian male television actors
Australian television presenters
Chantoozies members
Living people
Logie Award winners
Male drummers
Nigerian people of Australian descent
Nigerian people of English descent
20th-century Australian musicians
Male actors from Melbourne
Radio personalities from Melbourne
Television personalities from Melbourne
Musicians from Melbourne
Australian people of English descent
People from Mount Eliza, Victoria